Les Misérables: Highlights from the Motion Picture Soundtrack is the film soundtrack for the Universal Pictures film Les Misérables, performed by Hugh Jackman, Russell Crowe, Anne Hathaway, Amanda Seyfried, Eddie Redmayne, Samantha Barks, Aaron Tveit, Helena Bonham Carter, Sacha Baron Cohen and other artists. It was released on December 21, 2012. The music is written by Claude-Michel Schönberg; the lyrics by Herbert Kretzmer based on the French text by Alain Boublil and Jean-Marc Natel.

Production
In an interview with BBC Radio 4's Front Row, Tom Hooper the film's director, revealed that Claude-Michel Schönberg would be composing one new song and additional music. In February 2012, Cameron Mackintosh revealed a newly created song, "Suddenly", that "explains what happens when Valjean takes Cosette from the inn and looks after her."

The film's vocals were recorded live on set using live piano accompaniments played through earpieces as a guide, with the orchestral accompaniment recorded in post-production, rather than actors lip-syncing to a  pre-recorded musical soundtrack. Tom Hooper explained that this would eliminate the need to recapture "locked" performances and allow more creative freedom. Despite the film's creative team claiming this live recording method "a world's-first", several film musicals have utilized this method before, including the At Long Last Love (1975), The Fantasticks (1995) and Across the Universe (2007). On 9 September 2012, Universal Studios executives were granted a viewing of the rough cut of the film without the orchestra. The cut was greeted with "extreme excitement", and Russell Crowe tweeted that he received many excited emails. Orchestral recording sessions for Les Misérables began in London on 10 October 2012 with a 70-piece orchestra.

Content
The Highlights album doesn't contain all musical numbers in the film, with traditional show highlights such as "Who am I?" and "A Little Fall of Rain" being omitted. The famous anthem "Do You Hear the People Sing?" does not appear on the album except for its reprise in the "Epilogue". Songs included on the album are often also incomplete in comparison with the movie itself (for example, At the End of the Day on the album is missing Fantine's explanation.)

A 2-Disc Deluxe Edition, released on March 19, 2013, comprised 42 tracks, including several of songs omitted on the highlights album as well as a few instrumental pieces. However, like the highlights album, many of the songs are still cut short due to time.

Commercial performance
Upon its release, Les Misérables debuted at number thirty-three on the Billboard 200 and at number one on the Billboard Soundtracks chart, selling 43,000 copies in less than three full days of release, according to Nielsen SoundScan. The following week, it sold 136,000 copies to jump to number two on the Billboard 200. The soundtrack topped the Billboard 200 in its third week on the chart, selling 92,000 copies. The total of 178,000 copies sold from the ten days of sales made it the tenth best-selling soundtrack album of 2012.  It sold a further 512,000 copies in the United States in 2013, making it the third best-selling soundtrack of 2013. As of January 2014, it had sold a total of 690,000 copies in the US.

The album entered the UK Albums Chart at number five with first-week sales of 13,844 copies, before rising to number one the following week on sales of 55,954 copies. The album spent four non-consecutive weeks atop the chart.

In Japan, the album reached number eleven on the Japanese Albums Chart, and was certified gold by the Recording Industry Association of Japan (RIAJ) in March 2013, denoting shipments of 100,000 copies.

Track listing

Charts

Weekly charts

Year-end charts

Decade-end charts

Singles

Certifications

}

See also
 Les Misérables, the 1862 novel by Victor Hugo
 List of UK Albums Chart number ones of the 2010s
 List of number-one albums of 2012 (South Korea)
 List of number-one albums of 2013 (Ireland)
 List of number-one albums of 2013 (U.S.)
 Adaptations of Les Misérables

References

2012 soundtrack albums
Musical film soundtracks
Universal Republic Records soundtracks